Marjorie Bennett (15 January 1896 – 14 June 1982) was an Australian actress who worked mainly in the United Kingdom and the United States. She began her acting career during the silent film era.

Career
Bennett was born in York in Western Australia. Her sisters Enid (1893–1969) and Catherine (1901–1978) were also Hollywood film actresses. Bennett began acting in films in 1917 and later made the transition to talking pictures with bit roles in Monsieur Verdoux (1947), Abbott and Costello Meet the Killer, Boris Karloff (1949), and Washington Story (1952). In 1952, she appeared as Charlie Chaplin's landlady in the film Limelight and later had guest roles on The Great Gildersleeve, Four Star Playhouse, Sergeant Preston of the Yukon, I Love Lucy, Schlitz Playhouse of Stars, and December Bride. Between 1958 and 1961, she appeared as Amanda Comstock in three episodes of ABC's The Real McCoys, starring Walter Brennan. From 1959 to 1961, she was cast ten times as Blossom Kenney on CBS' The Many Loves of Dobie Gillis, starring Dwayne Hickman.

During the 1970s, Bennett had television roles on Mission: Impossible, Adam-12, CHiPs, Night Gallery, McMillan & Wife, and Phyllis. She had a role opposite Richard Widmark in the 1973 television film Brock's Last Case. In the 1973 film Charley Varrick, starring Walter Matthau, Bennett portrayed Mrs. Taft, an elderly gardener living in a trailer park who is convinced that every man she meets wants to seduce her. Bennett also appeared in several television commercials in the 1970s. She made her last on-screen appearance in 1980 on ABC's Barney Miller series.

Personal life
Bennett was married to William Cady Jr., from 1932 until his death in 1976.

Bennett died in Hollywood, California, on 14 June 1982, and her ashes were interred in the Great Mausoleum's Columbarium of Dawn at Forest Lawn Memorial Park Cemetery in Glendale.

Filmography

References

External links
 
 

1896 births
1982 deaths
Actresses from Western Australia
Australian expatriate actresses in the United States
Australian film actresses
Australian silent film actresses
Australian television actresses
Burials at Forest Lawn Memorial Park (Glendale)
People from York, Western Australia
20th-century Australian actresses
Australian expatriate actresses in the United Kingdom
19th-century Australian women